Alice Brusewitz (née Palmer) was a New Zealand commercial photographer.

Around 1887 Brusewitz married photographer Henry Elis Leopold Brusewitz, who had been born in Sweden and migrated to New Zealand. The couple lived in Nelson and ran a photographic business there. They also both exhibited photographs, for example for the opening of the Suter Art Gallery in 1899.

References

New Zealand photographers
19th-century New Zealand women
Year of birth missing
Year of death missing
New Zealand women photographers